Sylviane Puntous is a Canadian former triathlete who won the Hawaii Ironman Triathlon in 1983 and 1984, beating her twin sister Patricia Puntous into second place on both occasions. She was the first non-American winner (male or female) of this championship.

Results

Notes 

Canadian female triathletes
Ironman world champions
Living people
Canadian twins
Twin sportspeople

Year of birth missing (living people)
20th-century Canadian women